George Tobolowsky is an American sculptor from Dallas, Texas. His works made from reclaimed materials have been featured in several solo and group exhibitions in museums, sculpture gardens, and galleries.

Biography 
Tobolowsky was born to a large Jewish family in Dallas, Texas. He is a descendant of Russian immigrants to the United States. Tobolowsky has two sisters; his brother Ira Tobolowsky was a noted attorney. Several other members of the Tobolowsky family are also attorneys including Dallas District Court Judge Emily Tobolowsky. He attended Hillcrest High School and went on to study accounting and sculpture at Southern Methodist University. Tobolowsky studied sculpture with James Surls and Louise Nevelson. He also later graduated with a Juris Doctor degree from SMU Law School in the early 1970s.

Tobolowsky began his career as an accountant at an accounting firm in Dallas before working at the legal and tax departments of the Zale Corporation. With partners, Tobolowsky owned franchise businesses including, at one time, up to 75 Blockbuster stores and several Dunkin' Donuts locations. In 1995, he built a sculpture studio in Mountain Springs but he did not begin making sculptures until 2004. Much like the sculptures he would later create, the studio was constructed with reclaimed materials.

Tobolowsky is married to Julie Tobolowsky and they have four children and live in Dallas.

Sculpture 
Since Tobolowsky began making sculptures in the mid-2000s, he has created more than 500 sculptures which have been exhibited in solo and group exhibitions. Tobolowsky makes sculpture from found objects. He obtains material for his sculptures from scrap yards and fabrication plants, bringing together the repurposed industrial waste into abstract compositions. Although Tobolowsky's works can sometimes weigh several tons, they have been described as "light and lyrical".

In 2006, Tobolowsky had his first solo exhibition at Gerald Peters Gallery in Dallas. His works have since also been exhibited at The Grace Museum, San Angelo Museum of Fine Arts, and Meadows Museum of Art. In October 2012, his 13-feet Ann-e Girl, a depiction a "tree of life" growing out of a metal brassiere was featured at the finish line of the Susan G. Komen Race for the Cure. The piece includes a 13-foot version of the garment with straps and a pair of cups fashioned from stainless steel tanks. Beginning in November 2012, the Museum of Biblical Art in Dallas also exhibited a sculpture by Tobolowsky, menorahs "made of polished steel found objects including drills and parts from airplanes and trucks".

In 2015, Tobolowsky was featured in Texas!, an exhibit of Texas-based artists at the National Academy of Art in New Delhi, India. At the 2017 Jerusalem Biennale, he was featured in the exhibition named Jewish Artists in America.

Notable exhibitions 
 2010, Form & Substance: The Art of George Tobolowsky at The Grace Museum in Abilene, Texas
2010, Tyler Museum of Art in Tyler, Texas
2011, Ellen Noël Art Museum in Odessa, Texas
2012, Blue Star Contemporary Art Center in San Antonio, Texas
2015, Texas! at the National Academy of Art in New Delhi, India
2017, The Jerusalem Biennale for Contemporary Jewish Art, Jerusalem, Israel
 2017, Meadows Museum of Art in Shreveport, Louisiana
 2017, Lucile Halsell Conservatory at the Botanical Garden in San Antonio, Texas
2018, "A Long Road Back", University of Mississippi Museum, Oxford, Mississippi

References

External links 
 

People from Dallas
Living people
20th-century American sculptors
20th-century American male artists
21st-century American sculptors
21st-century American male artists
Year of birth missing (living people)